This is a list of Algerian football transfers in the 2021 summer transfer window by club. Clubs in the 2021–22 Algerian Ligue Professionnelle 1 are included.

Ligue Professionnelle 1

ASO Chlef

In:

Out:

CR Belouizdad

In:

Out:

CS Constantine

In:

Out:

ES Sétif

In:

Out:

JS Kabylie

In:

Out:

JS Saoura

In:

Out:

MC Alger

In:

Out:

MC Oran

In:

Out:

NA Hussein Dey

In:

Out:

NC Magra

In:

Out:

Paradou AC

In:

Out:

USM Alger

In:

Out:

US Biskra

In:

Out:

Olympique de Médéa

In:

Out:

WA Tlemcen

In:

Out:

RC Relizane

In:

Out:

RC Arbaâ

In:

Out:

HB Chelghoum Laïd

In:

Out:

References

Algeria
Lists of Algerian football transfers
2021–22 in Algerian football